Begay v. United States, 553 U.S. 137 (2008), is a United States Supreme Court case which held that felony driving while intoxicated is not a "violent felony" for purposes of the Armed Career Criminal Act.

Background 
Larry Begay had multiple felony convictions for driving under the influence of alcohol (DUI) in New Mexico. He was found to be in possession of a firearm when he was arrested by the local police in a domestic incident.

Under federal law it is illegal for a convicted felon to possess a firearm. Begay pleaded guilty in federal court to unlawful possession of a firearm. The pre-sentencing report showed that Begay had been convicted twelve times of DUI. Under New Mexico law, each DUI conviction after the first three was considered a felony.

The U.S. District Court for the District of New Mexico concluded that DUI was a "violent felony" under the Armed Career Criminal Act, thereby triggering that Act's 15-year mandatory minimum sentence. A divided United States Court of Appeals for the Tenth Circuit panel affirmed the decision to treat the DUIs as "violent felonies."

Opinion of the Court 
In a 6–3 vote, the Court held that DUI was not a "violent felony" because the crime was too different from the violent felony examples provided by Congress in the Armed Career Criminal Act (such as burglary, arson and extortion). Therefore, Begay should not have been subject to the mandatory sentencing hike.

Justice Breyer wrote the majority opinion with Justice Scalia concurring. Justice Alito dissented, with Justices Thomas and Souter, joining.

References

External links
 
 Oral Argument Transcript

United States Supreme Court cases
United States Supreme Court cases of the Roberts Court
2008 in United States case law
United States criminal case law
Armed Career Criminal Act case law